Women's football in Wales is overseen by the Football Association of Wales and is affiliated with both the world (FIFA) and European (UEFA) football governing bodies. As such the national team are eligible to compete in the World Cup and the European Championship. The winners of the top tier league is invited to join the qualifying stage of the Champions League.

History

Women's football first became popular in Wales during WW1. In March 1922, following complaints from religious congregations, the Football Association of Wales also implemented a total ban. However, the ban was initially less comprehensive and less consistently applied than in England, with the Marquis of Bute authorising Dick, Kerr Ladies F.C. to hold a charity match against Olympic de Paris just three weeks after the FAW announced the ban. The match, held at Cardiff Arms Park, attracted an audience of 15,000 and raised funds for the restoration of Reims Cathedral. In 1939, the FAW instituted a stronger version of the ban, decreeing that "no football match in which any lady or ladies take part in any way whatsoever shall be permitted to be played on any football ground within the jurisdiction of this Association. Clubs, officials, players or referees are not permitted to associate themselves in any way whatsoever with Ladies Football matches." The ban was lifted on 29 May 1970, and the sport experienced a revival in the 1990s.

Domestic League
The pyramid in Wales consists of four tiers. The top two are run directly by the Welsh FA, whilst Tiers 3 and 4 are run by local FA's. Founded in 2009, the top level of domestic football is the Welsh Premier Women's Football League, below which Tier 2 is split into Northern and Southern sections. Levels 3 and 4 are regionalised still further. The winner of the Premier League each season qualifies for the UEFA Women's Champions League. Three teams have been crowned champions since: Cardiff Met. Ladies (6 times), Swansea City Ladies (5 times) and Cardiff City (once). There is also a two-tier Under 19 Development system running parallel to the open age one.

The FAW Women's Cup is the premier national cup competition which was founded in 1992. In the 2021/22 tournament 30 teams entered. The most successful team are Cardiff City with 11 wins, followed by Barry Town Ladies F.C. who have lifted in 4 times. A Premier League Cup was started in 2014.

National team 

The national team are affiliated with both UEFA and FIFA. Founded in 1973, they first entered the FIFA Women's World Cup and UEFA Women's Championship in 1995. They are yet to qualify for the final stages of either tournament, their best effort being during the attempt to reach the 2019 World Cup, when they came second in their group. In June 2018 they reached an all time high position of 29 in the FIFA rankings, in contrast to their lowest position of 57 in 2006. There are also national teams for women and girls at age restricted levels (under 19, under 17 etc.). As of November 2021 current internationals Jess Fishlock and Helen Ward are the most capped and highest scoring senior national players in history.

See also
Football in Wales
Wales women's national football team
Bans of women's association football

References